Monmouth Town Football Club is a Welsh football club based in the historic town of Monmouth. The club plays in the Ardal Leagues South East, tier 3 of the Welsh football pyramid.

History
Association football was first played in Monmouth as early as February 1870. Regular association matches was played between Monmouth Grammar School and Troy FC (Mitchel Troy). By 1874, both teams had fully converted to rugby, and very rarely played association football over the next few years. At the beginning of the 1888/1889 season. Monmouth Association Football Club were formed. Their first match was a 6–3 win at home to Micheltroy. Monmouth lost their second match 5–0 away to Abergavenny AFC. During their third match, away to Micheltroy, one of Monmouth's players, T. T. Williams, a Monmouth Grammar School pupil, broke his leg during the match. The match was immediately abandoned. Monmouth were winning 2–1. Their fourth match was against a team called "Minstrels", where the Minstrels club played in costume. Monmouth won 5–2. Another match was announced at home to Abergavenny AFC, but it seems this match was not played. No other matches was reported during their first season. It seems Monmouth AFC only played 1 season, as there is no evidence to suggest that the club carried on playing after this season. There is evidence to suggest that an 'association club' was playing in all white at Dixton Road in the town in the year 1906. The Monmouth Beacon of 14 December recalls this and adds a comment about a period when football had been extinct in Monmouth.  Indeed, research shows that Monmouth were joint champions of the Monmouth and District League in 1925–26 with Clearwell FC.

The next honour recorded by the Town was victory on the Monmouthshire Senior Cup on the eve of war in 1940, defeating Lovell's Athletic, (aka the Toffeemen) then about to lift the Southern League West title, 3–2 at Monmouth Sportsground which is still home today.

Nearly 20 years later, in 1958, the Town lifted the Monmouthshire Amateur Cup beating Cefn Fforest 3–0 at Pontllanfraith. The following season saw victories in both the Monmouthshire Senior and Monmouth Amateur cups.

Town's only appearance in the FA Cup was a 2nd preliminary round defeat away at Llanelli on 6 October 1945.

Silverware was scarce with wins in the Gwent Amateur Cup in 1984 and 1996 being highlights of many years gracing the fields of Newport and the Gwent Leagues with an occasional foray into the English Forest of Dean and Herefordshire leagues.

More recently the Town were relegated to the bottom tier of the Gwent County just three years ago. The returning Andrew Smith took up the reins and gained promotion in his first season in charge finishing runners up to Rogerstone. At the beginning of 2005–06 season the club adopted 'the Kingfishers' nickname and logo in homage to a peculiar legend outlined later.

The season ended with fourteen match winning run as Town clinched the Gwent County Division Two title ahead of Newport Civil Service.

2006–07 almost saw a repeat but were Town were pipped by Civil for the title. However, The Kingfishers were offered the chance to take the step into the Welsh league for the first time in their history.

With Robin Pick and Barry Burns at the helm The Kingfishers won the Division Three title in 2010–11 and followed it with The Division Two title in 2011–12, Dan MacDonald scoring a remarkable 44 goals.

Their first ever season in Division One ended with a seventh-place finish after topping the table as late as March. The Kingfishers were also finalists in the Gwent Senior Cup for the first time since 1940 but lost out 1–0 to Caldicot Town.

16 times capped Steve Jenkins took over in June 2013 and after reaching the last sixteen of the Welsh Cup on 17 May 2014 The Club clinched the Division One title capping a remarkable rise up the divisions with a 2–0 win at Cwmbran Celtic.

A sixth-place finish was offset by winning the Gwent Senior cup for the first time since 1940 in a stunning 8–0 win against Panteg.  During the four rounds Town scored 22 goals with just 2 against.

The club is a member of Gwent County F.A.  On 8 August 2011, Monmouth Town F.C. entered into an agreement to be purchased by internet venture fivepoundfootballclub.com. In September 2011 the club established itself as a Community Interest Company, the first of its kind in Wales. The club's rally cry is "Kingfishers All The Way!"

After narrowly missing out on promotion in 2018–19 season and a change of manager, Monmouth Town F.C. announced Scott Russell as the new First Team Manager, Scott decided to leave his role as Goalkeeping Coach at Hereford F.C. to take on his new role at the Kingfishers in June 2019. He will be assisted by Steve Saunders and Dan Chance, both coaches were also at Hereford F.C. before joining the club with Scott. The management's aim for the 2019–20 season was to be competitive and look to take one of the three promotion places into the Welsh Championship (Tier 2), and to help develop the club as a whole and invest time into the impressive youth set up the club currently has.

Colours and crest
The main colours for Monmouth Town F.C. are yellow and blue, which have been used throughout their recent history.

The Monmouth Town F.C. crest is a large yellow crest with a blue circle and text. The top of the circle has the name of the club in English, "Monmouth Town Football Club". Prominently positioned in the middle is a picture of the Kingfisher and the numbers 19 and 30 on either side of the bird. The name of the club in Welsh, "Clwb Pêl-Droed Trefynwy", adorns the bottom of the circle.

The Kingfisher Legend

Some local folklore has it that in about 1936 there were extremely bad spring floods on the Monnow and Wye which effectively wiped out all of the Kingfisher nests along the rivers. Until then Monmouth had been a magnet for ornithologists from all over the country to see Britain's most beautiful bird in all its glory. Official government sources from the Department of Agriculture, Fisheries and Timber recorded their alarm at the plight of the Kingfisher population and a detailed study was carried out to assess the damage. Amazingly the only surviving pair of breeding Kingfishers were found nesting in a deflated football that had floated down the Monnow into the Wye and lodged itself with its laces in some branches overlooking the river. It was in the days before the Magic Marker so it could not be proven that the ball had been lost in a game at the Town's sportsground but it was deemed the obvious cause. And so ....one loose shot saved the entire Kingfisher population of the Wye and Monnow rivers.

Stadiums 
Monmouth Town F.C. has spent over eight decades playing at Chippenham Sports Ground, located on Blestium Street in Monmouth.  The current grandstand was originally sited at the Monmouth Racecourse on Vauxhall Fields and relocated in around 1920.

In August 2014 The Club moved its first team to Pen Y Pound Stadium Abergavenny, to improve their chances of being able to take up any future promotion to the Welsh Premier League.

In May 2015 The club aborted their stay at Abergavenny citing a breakdown in the relationship and returned to Monmouth.

Support
Having recently agreed to be purchased by FivePoundFootballClub.com, the Kingfishers can boast one of the most global followings of all Welsh teams. With part-owners that span the entire world, the Kingfishers have recently begun big steps to expand their online presence. Kingfisher TV recently began broadcasting from YouTube. They have also recently had a fan-created sub-reddit created on the online community, Reddit.

Ownership and Finances
The club is incorporated as a Community Interest Company (social enterprise model with assets locked into the company). Having been selected by FivePoundFootballClub as the takeover target of their online investment community, the Kingfishers are currently awaiting for a total investment that will amount to the fan-owned group taking a 51% ownership of the club within 5 years from late 2011. The amateur club had been able to pay its expenses while making a modest profit before the takeover was announced.

Honours
Monmouth & District League Winners: – 1926
 Monmouthshire/Gwent Senior Cup Winners: – 1940, 2015
 Monmouthshire/Gwent Amateur Cup Winners: – 1958, 1959, 1984, 1986, 1996
 Gwent County Division 3 Runners up: – 2005
 Gwent County Division 2 Champions: – 2006
 Gwent County Division 1 Runners up: – 2007
 Welsh League Division Three Champions: – 2010–11
 Welsh League Division Two Champions: – 2011–12
 Welsh League Division One Champions: – 2013–14

Staff
 President: Terry Cleaves
 Chairman: Rob Laurie
 Vice Chairman: David Uttley
 Youth Chairman: Paul Burke
 Club Secretary: Peter Jefferies
 Youth Secretary: Karen Scott
 Youth Goalkeeping Coach: Scott Russell
 Club Captain:	Ash Ford
 Assistant Secretary: Vacant
 Treasurer: Ben Gouldingay
 Commercial Manager: Rob Laurie
 IT Comms: Dan Evans
 Child Welfare Officer: Jonty Wright
 First Team Manager: Scott Russell
 First Team Assistant Manager: Dan Chance
 Data Analysis: Alex Jenkins
 Reserve Team Manager: Richard Finn
 Club Physiotherapist: John Fitzgerald

Supporters Club
 Chair: Nicola Johns
 Board President: Steve Hughes
 Finance Officer: Vacant
 Media Relations: James Cart

See also
Monmouth

References

External links
Official club website
Five Pound Football Club Website
Welsh League Division One Tables

Independent sites
Monmouth F.C.'s Reddit Page

Football clubs in Wales
Association football clubs established in 1930
Football club
1930 establishments in Wales
Welsh Football League clubs
Ardal Leagues clubs